Mansfeld is an electoral constituency (German: Wahlkreis) represented in the Bundestag. It elects one member via first-past-the-post voting. Under the current constituency numbering system, it is designated as constituency 74. It is located in southern Saxony-Anhalt, comprising the Mansfeld-Südharz district and most of the Saalekreis district.

Mansfeld was created for the inaugural 1990 federal election after German reunification. Since 2021, it has been represented by Robert Farle of the Alternative for Germany (AfD).

Geography
Mansfeld is located in southern Saxony-Anhalt. As of the 2021 federal election, it comprises the entirety of the Mansfeld-Südharz district and the Saalekreis district excluding the municipalities of Bad Dürrenberg, Braunsbedra, Kabelsketal, Landsberg, Leuna, Petersberg, and Schkopau.

History
Mansfeld was created after German reunification in 1990, then known as Eisleben – Hettstedt – Sangerhausen. In the 2002 and 2005 elections, it was named Mansfelder Land. It acquired its current name in the 2009 election. In the 1990 through 1998 elections, it was constituency 295 in the numbering system. In the 2002 through 2009 elections, it was number 75. Since the 2013 election, it has been number 74.

Originally, it comprised the districts of Eisleben, Hettstedt, and Sangerhausen. In the 2002 and 2005 elections, it comprised the districts of Sangerhausen and Mansfelder Land as well as the municipality of Querfurt and the municipal associations of Bad Lauchstädt, Oberes Geiseltal, and Weida-Land from Merseburg-Querfurt district. It acquired its current borders in the 2009 election.

Members
The constituency was first represented by Heinz Rother of the Christian Democratic Union (CDU) from 1990 to 1994, followed by Frederick Schulze from 1994 to 1998. It was won by the Social Democratic Party (SPD) in 1998, and Silvia Schmidt served until 2009. Harald Koch of The Left was elected representative in 2009. The CDU's candidate Uda Heller won it in 2013 and served a single term. Torsten Schweiger of the CDU was elected in 2017. Robert Farle won the constituency for the Alternative for Germany (AfD) in 2021.

Election results

2021 election

2017 election

2013 election

2009 election

References

Federal electoral districts in Saxony-Anhalt
Mansfeld-Südharz
1990 establishments in Germany
Constituencies established in 1990